This article lists the six underground stations and five below ground level stations of the Merseyrail network which is centred on Liverpool, England.

Underground stations

Sub-surface stations - built in cuttings

Former stations

Merseytravel intend that St James railway station will be reopened as part of the Liverpool City Region transport plan.

Future

St James railway station, which has been closed for a century, may reopen because of the important Baltic Triangle development in Toxteth. If opened, the station will be on the Merseyrail Northern Line between Liverpool Central and Brunswick railway station

Notes

References

Sources

 
List of underground stations